Carlos Eduardo Castro Mora (born 10 September 1978) is a retired  Costa Rican football player.

Early life

Castro was raised by his grandparents.

Club career
He made his professional debut on 19 October 1997 for Alajuelense against Puntarenas and also scored his first goal against Puntarenas on 15 November 1998, but was rumoured to be kicked off of the team for apparently drinking problems (which he denies). In 2003, he moved abroad to play for Rubin Kazan in Russia whom he left in May 2004 to return to Alajuelense. He has played as left back or left midfielder and dribbles and crosses well, he also has good passing skills.

In January 2007 he signed on a free deal for Norwegian firstdivision club, FK Haugesund, but left the club in January 2008 due to the family did not want to stay in Norway. He decided to go back to Costa Rica after a good season in Norway, and signed for his beloved team, Alajuelense. As soon as he signed, he became a regular in the starting line-up. In June 2010 he left them for Puntarenas and he later played for Brujas.

In summer 2011 he had a very short stint at Herediano, joining them in June and leaving them already in August. In summer 2012, Castro was snapped up by Carmelita and on 1 May 2014 he announced his retirement.

International career
Castro played at the 1995 FIFA U-17 World Championship and 1997 FIFA World Youth Championship.

He made his senior debut for the Ticos in a June 2000 friendly match against Paraguay and has earned a total of 48 caps, scoring 1 goal. He has represented his country in 12 FIFA World Cup qualification matches and played in Costa Rica's all three matches at the 2002 FIFA World Cup. He also played at the 2003 UNCAF Nations Cup as well as at the 2002 and 2003 CONCACAF Gold Cups and the 2001 Copa América.

His final international was an October 2007 friendly match against Haiti.

International goals
Scores and results list Costa Rica's goal tally first.

Honours
Primera División de Costa Rica (5):
1999-00, 2000–01, 2001–02, 2002–03, 2004–05
Copa Interclubes UNCAF (2):
2002, 2005
 CONCACAF Gold Cup Best XI: 2003

References

External links

1978 births
Living people
People from Alajuela
Association football defenders
Costa Rican footballers
Costa Rica international footballers
2001 Copa América players
2002 CONCACAF Gold Cup players
2002 FIFA World Cup players
2003 UNCAF Nations Cup players
2003 CONCACAF Gold Cup players
L.D. Alajuelense footballers
FC Rubin Kazan players
FK Haugesund players
Puntarenas F.C. players
Brujas FC players
C.S. Herediano footballers
A.D. Carmelita footballers
Russian Premier League players
Norwegian First Division players
Liga FPD players
Costa Rican expatriate footballers
Expatriate footballers in Russia
Expatriate footballers in Norway
Copa Centroamericana-winning players
Central American Games gold medalists for Costa Rica
Central American Games medalists in football